The Burton is a Dutch sports car based on French 2CV technology.  The Burton is an open, nostalgic-looking sports car built on the chassis of the 2CV with a modern fibreglass body-kit. The car can be built as an open two-seater, or with a hardtop with gull-wing doors or with a custom made convertible roof. From the beginning of 2002, Burton is available all over Europe.

Late 1998, Iwan and Dimitri Goebel started to design the Burton, then codenamed 'Hunter'. They were inspired by legendary sports cars, such as Bugatti, Jaguar, Talbot-Lago, Delahaye and Alfa Romeo. After 18 months, the prototype was ready and on February 9, 2000, the first body was taken from the mould. In May 2000, the Burton was introduced to Dutch customers.

Burton also imports and sells the Lomax in the Netherlands.

In 2019 The Burton Car Company And its subsidiary 2CV Parts went on sale for five Million euros 

In November 2022 Burton Cars was sold to the french company 2CV Mehari Club Cassis.

References

External links 
Official website
Burton parts website

Cars of the Netherlands
Kit car manufacturers
Front-wheel-drive sports cars